The Sanfratellano (or Razza di San Fratello) is an Italian light horse breed that originated in San Fratello, Sicily. They are a hardy breed that is used for riding, packing, and light draft work.

History
The San Fratellano comes from San Fratello, in the Nebrodi mountains in the province of Messina in Sicily. The horses developed and were bred in a native habitat that resulted in a strong, powerful type known for their endurance.

A Lombard princess, Adelaide del Vasto, married Roger I of Sicily, a Norman noble, in the 11th century AD. Sicily was ruled by Norman warlords at the time, and Princess Adelaide del Vasto brought to Sicily her retinue, including a number of knights and their horses. To this day the people of San Fratello speak a Lombard dialect, different from the Sicilian language of surrounding areas. The San Fratellano horse is said to have descended from the horses of the Lombard knights.

The breed has received infusions of Anglo-Arab, Spanish Anglo-Arab, Salerno and Nonius blood, and has remained quite true to type. It resembles its fellow Italian breed, the Maremmano.  Breeding stock is carefully selected for propagation, and most colts are trained young as pack horses.

Breed characteristics
They are muscular, well-built horses that are hardy and easy to care for. There are approximately 5,000 horses of this breed (including 1,800 broodmares), making it one of the most numerous indigenous breeds in Italy.

References

External links
Sanfratellano stallion, YouTube
Six Sanfratellano stallions at Fiera Cavalli, 2010, YouTube

Horse breeds
Horse breeds originating in Italy